This is a list of Monuments of National Importance as officially recognized by and available through the website of the Archaeological Survey of India (ASI) in the Indian union territory of Jammu and Kashmir. The monument identifier is a combination of the abbreviation of the subdivision of the list (state, ASI circle) and the numbering as published on the website of the ASI. 56 Monuments of National Importance have been recognized by the ASI in Jammu and Kashmir.

List of monuments of national importance 

|}

See also 
 List of Monuments of National Importance in India for other Monuments of National Importance in India
 List of State Protected Monuments in Jammu and Kashmir

References 

Jammu and Kashmir
Monuments
Buildings and structures in Jammu and Kashmir